Bibio ferruginatus is a species of fly from the family Bibionidae.

References

Bibionidae
Insects described in 1767
Nematoceran flies of Europe
Taxa named by Carl Linnaeus